Michael Klueh (born March 15, 1987) is an American competition swimmer.  He is a four-time medalist (three gold, one silver) at the World Championships. He is also an eight-time medalist (four gold, two silver, two bronze) at the World University Games. Klueh competed for the University of Texas from 2005 to 2009 where he was a 2009 NCAA champion as a member of the 4x200 yard freestyle relay. He is a former American record holder in the 800 short course meter freestyle and former Texas 5A state high school record-holder in the 500-yard freestyle. Klueh is currently an orthopaedic surgery resident at the University of Michigan Medical School.

References

External links
 
 
 Michael Klueh – Texas Longhorns athlete bio

1987 births
Living people
American male freestyle swimmers
Medalists at the FINA World Swimming Championships (25 m)
Texas Longhorns men's swimmers
Swimmers at the 2015 Pan American Games
World Aquatics Championships medalists in swimming
Pan American Games silver medalists for the United States
Pan American Games medalists in swimming
Universiade medalists in swimming
Universiade gold medalists for the United States
Universiade silver medalists for the United States
Universiade bronze medalists for the United States
Medalists at the 2005 Summer Universiade
Medalists at the 2007 Summer Universiade
Medalists at the 2011 Summer Universiade
Medalists at the 2015 Pan American Games
University of Michigan Medical School alumni